Wolfe's Neck may refer to:

Wolfe's Neck Woods State Park, located in Freeport, Maine, USA
Wolfe's Neck Farm, located near the above state park